I Am Mordred is a fantasy novel written by Nancy Springer. It begins with King Arthur having fathered a child with his half-sister Morgause and placing all the newborn babies born on May 30 on a boat to drown, including his own son, Mordred. After a long, hard voyage through the cold waters of the ocean, only Mordred survives. A fisherman and his wife find and adopt him. When Mordred is about six years old, Nyneve, a sorceress, approaches and takes Mordred away to his biological mother. Mordred is not too keen on becoming a prince, for that means that he has to be a brave, strong, and a skilled warrior, someone he is not.

Reception
I am Mordred is a Booklist's Top 10 Fantasy Books for 1999 and an ALA's Best Book for Young Adults. The novel also won the 1999 Carolyn W. Field Award.

References

External links

2001 American novels
Modern Arthurian fiction
Novels by Nancy Springer